The Scourge of God may refer to:

 Attila the Hun who was known by this name
 (In medieval ecclesiastical legend) a generalized epithet for any disaster afflicting a nation because of sin 
 The Black Death
 Genghis Khan, etc.
 (Alternately) the affliction of the virtuous through same, using "scourge" in the sense of purification through mortification
 The Scourge of God (film), a 1920 film directed by Michael Curtiz
 The Scourge of God (novel), a 2008 novel written by S. M. Stirling